is an above-ground metro station located in Kōhoku-ku, Yokohama, Kanagawa Prefecture, Japan operated by the Yokohama Municipal Subway’s Blue Line (Line 3). It is 31.8 kilometers from the terminus of the Blue Line at Shōnandai Station.

History
Nippa Station was opened on March 18, 1993. Platform screen doors were installed in April 2007.

Lines
Yokohama Municipal Subway
Blue Line

Station layout
Nippa Station has two elevated island platforms serving four tracks. The ground-level station building is located underneath the tracks and platforms. The inner Tracks 2 and 3 are used for services originating at Nippa Station

Platforms

References
 Harris, Ken and Clarke, Jackie. Jane's World Railways 2008-2009. Jane's Information Group (2008).

External links
 Nippa Station (Blue Line) 

Railway stations in Kanagawa Prefecture
Railway stations in Japan opened in 1993
Blue Line (Yokohama)